Pogonopoma wertheimeri is a species of armored catfish endemic to Brazil where it is found in the Mucuri River, São Mateus River, and Doce River. This species is usually found in stretches of river with mid to strong water current and bottom formed by rocks or sand. However, they are also found in the Juparanã lagoon, close to the mouth of the Doce river, which is a lentic habitat.  This species grows to a length of  SL.

References

Hypostominae
Fish of the Doce River basin
Endemic fauna of Brazil
Fish described in 1867